Invader Zim is an American animated dark comedy science fiction  television series that was created by comic book writer and cartoonist Jhonen Vasquez and aired on Nickelodeon. The series revolves around an extraterrestrial named Zim (voiced by Richard Steven Horvitz) from the planet Irk and his ongoing mission to conquer or destroy a dark and satirical version of the Earth. His various attempts to subjugate and destroy the human race are invariably undermined by some combination of his own ineptitude, his malfunctioning robot servant GIR (Rosearik Rikki Simons) and his nemesis Dib (Andy Berman), one of very few humans not oblivious enough to be unaware of Zim's identity.

Invader Zim premiered on March 30, 2001. The series was targeted at older children and adolescents and met with critical acclaim. As the series went on, ratings declined and budgetary issues became more frequent. Before the second season was completed, Nickelodeon canceled the series, leaving several episodes unfinished. The show originally ran on Nickelodeon from 2001 to 2002, with six of the completed second-season episodes initially going unreleased. These episodes were first made available on DVD in 2004 and later made their television debut on the Nicktoons Network in 2006. Despite its early cancellation, it has been widely regarded as a cult classic due to increasing popularity and above-average merchandise sales.

The series consists of a pilot episode, twenty-seven episodes split into forty-six episode segments, and at least seventeen unfinished episode segments that were in production at the time of the series' cancellation. On December 24, 2011, the pilot episode aired on television for the first time. Thirty-eight episode segments were originally broadcast in pairs, each 12-minute episode segment debuting in the same half-hour. There are eight double-length episodes which run for 24-minutes each. This list is ordered by the episode order in the DVD releases, with broadcast dates noted. Every episode was directed by Steve Ressel; except the pilot, which was directed by Jordan Reichek.

A television film based on the series, entitled Invader Zim: Enter the Florpus, premiered August 16, 2019 on Netflix.

Series overview

Episodes

Pilot
A pilot for Invader Zim was produced for Nickelodeon in 1999, featuring Billy West as the voice of Zim. However, because he was too busy with Futurama at the time, West was replaced by Richard Steven Horvitz in the series proper. It was first released publicly as a special feature on the Invader Zim Vol. 1: Doom Doom Doom DVD set on May 11, 2004. The pilot made its television debut simulcast on Nickelodeon and Nicktoons on December 24, 2011, as part of their "Nicktoon's Winter Funderland" block and the "Nicktoons on Nickelodeon block".

Season 1 (2001–02)
The first season of Invader Zim consists of twenty episodes, which are ordered below by production number and not their original broadcast order.Note: All episodes of the series were directed by Steve Ressel.

Season 2  (2002; 2006)
In August 2001, Nickelodeon officially renewed Invader Zim for a second season which was originally planned to consist of twenty episodes. In January 2002, Nickelodeon announced that they had plans to cancel the series. The series finished with a total of twenty-seven out of its initially contracted forty episodes, leaving several episodes unfinished. The seventh episode of season two aired on Nickelodeon on December 10, 2002. The remaining six completed second season episodes were initially unreleased. These episodes would first be made available on DVD in 2004 and later made their television debut on the Nicktoons Network in 2006.

Netflix film (2019)
In April 2017, Nickelodeon announced that there would be a television film based on the series. On June 26, 2018, it was announced that the film was titled Invader Zim: Enter the Florpus. The film released digitally on Netflix on August 16, 2019.

Notes

References

External links

Episodes
Lists of American children's animated television series episodes
Lists of American science fiction television series episodes
Invader Zim
Lists of American comedy television series episodes